Samuel Harry Fielding (born 2 November 1998) is an English professional footballer who plays as a midfielder for Bradford (Park Avenue).

Club career
Born in York, Fielding began his career with York City, and made his debut on 8 October 2016 against Braintree Town, playing 90 minutes in a 1–1 draw. He made a second appearance the following week in a FA Cup qualifying game against Curzon Ashton. He was praised for his mentality and described by the York Press as "one for the future", and was offered a new contract at the end of the season. but made the move to fellow Yorkshire side Barnsley. He signed a contract extension with Barnsley in 2019, but was released a year later.

He signed for EFL League Two side Salford City in September, and made his début for the club on 29 September in the EFL Trophy against Morecambe. He was an 85th-minute substitute for James Wilson as Salford City won 2–0. At the end of the 2020–21 season, it was announced that he would be leaving the club.

Following his release from Salford, he returned to National League North side York City, following a successful trial period.

On 22 January 2022, Fielding signed an 18-month contract with National League North side Bradford (Park Avenue).

Career statistics

Honours
Salford City
EFL Trophy: 2019–20

References

1998 births
Living people
Footballers from York
English footballers
Association football midfielders
York City F.C. players
Barnsley F.C. players
Bradford (Park Avenue) A.F.C. players
Salford City F.C. players
National League (English football) players